Banco Popolare Siciliano is a brand used by Banco Popolare in Sicily.

History

Predecessors
Banco Popolare Group had presented in Sicily since 1990s due to merger and acquisitions. According to Banca d'Italia data on 30 September 1999, Banca Popolare di Lodi (BPL) had 118 branches on the island, accounted for 7.3% of the total number of branches on the island. It was the second-largest banking network on the island, behind Banco di Sicilia which had a 34% market share. The sum of second to sixth largest banks on the island, was still smaller than Banco di Sicilia.

In 2006, a year before the formation of Banco Popolare, Banco Popolare di Verona e Novara had 17 branches on the island, as well as more than 100 branches of Banca Popolare Italiana (ex-BPL). In 2007, the merger of BPVN and BPI made Banco Popolare had 143 branches on the island, which was increased to 145 in the next year. In the same year Banca Popolare di Novara transferred all its 18 branches to Banca Popolare di Lodi, which the subsidiary was specialized in Lombardy (part), Romagna and Sicily. In 2010, the branches were reduced to 127.

The creation of Banco Popolare Siciliano
In 2011, BPV, BPL and BPN were ceased to be a company but a division of Banco Popolare. In 2012 the department Banco Popolare Siciliano was created and managed by the bank division of BPN.

See also

 Banca Agricola Popolare di Ragusa, an Italian bank
 Banca Nuova, a subsidiary of Banca Popolare di Vicenza
 Banca Popolare Sant'Angelo, an Italian bank
 Credito Siciliano, a subsidiary of Credito Valtellinese
 Banco di Sicilia, a defunct subsidiary of UniCredit

References

External links
  

Italian brands
Financial services brands
Banco Popolare
Sicily